Queen of Italy (regina Italiae in Latin and regina d'Italia in Italian) is a title adopted by many spouses of the rulers of the Italian peninsula after the fall of the Roman Empire. The details of where and how the ruling kings ruled are in the article about them. The elective dignity of Roman Emperor was restricted to males only; therefore, there was never an Italian Queen regnant, though women such as Adelaide of Italy and Theophanu and Maria Theresa of Austria, who controlled the power of ruling, ruled as de facto Queens Regnant.

Queen consorts of Italy, under Odoacer 
Unknown

Ostrogothic Queen consorts of Italy

Lombardic Queen consorts of Italy

Queen consorts of Italy

Carolingian dynasty, (774–887)

After 887, Italy fell into instability, with many rulers claiming the Kingship simultaneously:

Unruoching dynasty, (887–924)

Widonid dynasty, (889–896)

Carolingian Dynasty, (896–899)

Bosonid dynasty, (900–905)

Elder Welf dynasty, (922–926)

Bosonid dynasty, (926–950)

Anscarid dynasty, (950–963)

Ottonian dynasty, (951–1002) 
In 951 Otto I of Germany invaded Italy and was crowned "King of the Lombards". In 952, Berengar and Adalbert became in vassals but remained Kings until being deposed by Otto.

Anscarid dynasty, (1002–1014) 

After the brief interruption by Arduin of Ivrea and after the restoration of the Holy Roman Emperor as the sole holder of the title King of Italy, the title became one of the many appanages of the Holy Roman Empress.

Ottonian dynasty, (1004–1024)

Salian dynasty, (1026–1125)

House of Supplinburg, (1128–1137)

House of Hohenstaufen, (1154–1197)

House of Welf, (1208–1215)

House of Hohenstaufen, (1212–1250)

House of Luxembourg, (1308–1313)

House of Wittelsbach, (1327–1347)

House of Luxembourg, (1355–1437)

House of Habsburg, (1437–1745)

House of Bonaparte, (1805–1814)

House of Savoy, (1861–1946)

See also
List of Roman and Byzantine empresses
List of queens of the Lombards
Holy Roman Empresses
List of German queens
List of Burgundian consorts
Queens of Jerusalem
List of consorts of Naples
List of Sardinian consorts
List of Sicilian consorts
List of royal consorts of the Kingdom of the Two Sicilies
List of consorts of Savoy
List of consorts of Milan
List of consorts of Tuscany
List of consorts of Montferrat
List of consorts of Parma
List of consorts of Urbino
List of consorts of Modena
List of consorts of Mantua

Notes

Italy queens
Italy
 
Italy